Albert Thorpe was an English professional footballer who played as a wing half. He played three matches in the Football League for Plymouth Argyle in the 1920–21 season. The following season, he moved to Burnley, but did not play any league games for the club.

References

English footballers
Association football defenders
Burnley F.C. players
Plymouth Argyle F.C. players
English Football League players
Year of birth missing
Year of death missing